Mahatma Gandhi Memorial Government Medical College, Indore (MGM Medical College,Indore) is one of the oldest and premier government run medical colleges in India. Previously known as King Edward Medical School (KEMH), which was established in the year 1878, one of the earliest medical schools in Asia, it was converted into present medical college in 1948. Its teaching hospital Mahararaja Yeshwantrao Hospital (M.Y. Hospital) was established in 1955, was the largest hospital in Asia at the time of inception.

MBBS degrees were started from 1948 and selection done made through competitive exams. 
MD and MS degrees were started in the institution way back in 1953. MGM Medical College, Indore, had many pioneers in the field of Pediatrics, General Medicine, Surgery and subspecialities were started as early as 1950. MGM MC conducted the First All India Pediatrics Conference in 1955. A cardiology division was constructed in 1959 which conducted heart surgeries for poor people. MGM Medical College is one of the founder medical colleges associated with National Medical Library of India and RHD registry under ICMR.

Indore was once the centre of health care in western India. Central India's first medical institution, King Edward Medical School, was established here as early as 1878 & Indore charitable hospital was started early in 1847. The hospital is named after Yashwantrao Holkar, Maharaja of Indore, the last Holkar ruler. When it was inaugurated in 1955, it was Asia's largest government hospital and largest hospital till date in central India.

It is the first government hospital to be computerised. Its first dean was Dr. Bose, who was the head of department of pharmacology.

Total bed strength of 7 associated hospitals under MGM Medical College is around 2900. M. Y. Hospital has 1300 beds with all the major medical departments: surgery, medicine, obstetrics and gynaecology, dermatology, chest and TB, orthopaedics, E.N.T., ophthalmology, radiology, anaesthesiology, paediatrics, forensic medicine, and casualty, and superspeciality branches. Hospital has 25 bedded MICU, ICCU,15 hemodialysis machines, endoscopy unit. There are SICU, NICU, PICU, burn units, and surgical superspeciality units in M Y Hospital.This hospital gives special privilege to poor under a central government aided scheme.

It holds the reputation of a biggest tertiary care center in Central India and many government health schemes are operated by its social medicine department

This seven-storied government hospital is surrounded by a group of hospitals in MYH campus: 200-bedded Chacha Nehru Children's hospitals, 100-bedded M.R. TB hospital, 100-bedded cancer hospital, 600 bedded superspeciality hospital, 500 bedded MTH Women's hospital. The old KEM school is on this campus. It has a 100 bedded psychiatric hospital associated with it which is in Badganga, Indore.
125th anniversary of old King Edward Medical School & MGM Medical College, Indore was celebrated in 2003.

References

External links 
 http://www.mgmmcindore.in/

Universities and colleges in Indore
Science and technology in Indore
Educational institutions established in 1948
Medical colleges in Madhya Pradesh
1948 establishments in India
Affiliates of Madhya Pradesh Medical Science University